Silvana sin lana (stylized as Silvana $in lana) is an American telenovela written by Sandra Velasco for Telemundo. It is an original story by Rodrigo Bastidas and Elena Muñoz, adapted by Sandra Velasco and directed by Luis Manzo and Ricardo Schwarz, and as executive producer Carmen Cecilia Urbaneja. The show is a remake of the Chilean version Pituca Sin Lucas. It premiered on July 19, 2016.

The series stars Maritza Rodríguez as Silvana, Carlos Ponce as Manuel, Marimar Vega as Stella and Adriana Barraza as Trinidad.

Synopsis 
Silvana "Chivis" (Maritza Rodríguez), is a wealthy socialite with three daughters. When her husband flees from police before he’s arrested for fraud, Chivis and her family are left broke and homeless. She is forced to move to a modest middle class neighborhood of working people.  Here she meets her neighbor Manuel (Carlos Ponce), who owns a seafood business located in a large fish market. Manuel, his daughter and three sons are wary of everyone from high society and have issues with people who come from that social class. Once they meet, though, the attraction builds, but they do their utmost not to disrupt the balance of their lives and their families’ lives, regarding the difference in social status to be an obstacle to the love they feel.

Cast

Main 
 Maritza Rodríguez as Silvana "Chivis" Rivapalacios de Gallardo
 Carlos Ponce as Manuel Gallardo
 Marimar Vega as Stella Pérez
 Adriana Barraza as Trinidad "Trini" Altamirano de Rivapalacios

Recurring 
 Marcela Guirado as María José Villaseñor
 Ricardo Abarca as Vicente Gallardo
 Thali García as María de los Ángeles Villaseñor
 Alexandra Pomales as Lucía Gallardo
 Briggitte Bozzo as María Guadalupe Villaseñor
 Santiago Torres as Pedrito Gallardo
 Patricio Gallardo as Jorge Gallardo
 Roberto Escobar as Antonio José Villaseñor
 Samantha Dagnino as Margarita Hernández
 Raury Rolander as Alfonso "Poncho" Archundia
 Vince Miranda as Andres Montenegro
 Javier Valcárcel Domingo "Dominique" Gomez
 Eduardo Ibarrola as Don Benito de Mendoza
 Aniluli Muñecas as Jennifer
 Martha Pabón as Laura de Montenegro
 Ana Carolina Grajales as Alejandra
 Andres Cortino as Juanito
Estefany Oliveira as Genesis  
Gabriel Tarantini as Benjamin González 
Carl Mergenthaler as Rafael Linares
Samantha Lopez as Juanita Gallardo
Denise Novell as Fashionista

Awards and nominations

References 

Spanish-language American telenovelas
Telemundo telenovelas
2016 telenovelas
2016 American television series debuts
2017 American television series endings
American television series based on Chilean television series
American television series based on telenovelas